Edlira Dedja Bytyçi is an Albanian pianist, art critic, municipal councilor, and creator and leader of the cultural foundation Opera sans frontieres (Opera without borders)  in the capital of the Swiss canton of Neuchâtel on Lake Neuchâtel. 

She is a descendant of the academic and writer Bedri Dedja. Her work has included promoting opera artists including Saimir Pirgu and Ermonela Jaho, and has organised international charity concerts for the benefit of children with mental health problems. She has also worked with the Swiss organisation ASED - Action for the Support of Deprived Children, to create specialized centers of free services of support in Berat and other cities of Albania.

See also 
List of Albanians
Music of Albania

References

External links 
Bksh.al
Vace Zela News

People's Artists of Albania
20th-century Albanian musicians
21st-century Albanian musicians
Living people
Albanian women musicians
Albanian pianists
Women pianists
Albanian art critics
21st-century classical pianists
Year of birth missing (living people)